Jack Draney (10 May 1927 – October 2011) was an Australian cricketer. He played in two first-class matches for Queensland in 1949/50.

See also
 List of Queensland first-class cricketers

References

External links
 

1927 births
2011 deaths
Australian cricketers
Queensland cricketers
Cricketers from Brisbane